Thihapate of Mohnyin (also spelled Thihapatei of Mong Yang; –1450/51) was sawbwa of Mohnyin from 1439 to 1450/51, and governor of Pakhan from 1429 to 1450/51. He is best remembered in Burmese history for declining to take the Ava throne in 1442, after the death of King Minye Kyawswa I of Ava. He was a principal figure in Ava's reconquest of Mohnyin (1439), Kale (1439) and Mogaung (1442), and defense of the northern frontier states from Chinese incursions in the 1440s.

He was the father of Queen Ameitta Thiri Maha Dhamma Dewi of Ava.

Early life
The royal chronicles have no information about his background or early life except to mention in passing that he was a nephew of Queen Shin Myat Hla of Ava. Although it can be inferred from chronicle reporting that his parents were probably Thiri Zeya Thura the Elder and Shin Myat Hla of Pakhan, the narratives are not conclusive. The first mention of him in the chronicles comes at the coronation ceremony of King Mohnyin Thado on 20 May 1426. The new king, who had just seized the Ava throne, wedded his eldest daughter Shin Hla Myat to a nephew of his chief queen consort. The king also gave his new son-in-law the title of Thihapate, and the district of Pyinzi, a small district 60km south of the capital Ava (Inwa), in fief.

Career

Thihapate served as a loyal vassal of three kings for the next 25 years. He moved to Mohnyin after 1439 until his death in 1450/51.

Governorships at Pyinzi and Pakhan
Thihapate's years during King Thado's reign (1426–1439) were uneventful. He was part of his father-in-law's tight-knit circle that ruled the rump kingdom in which many former vassals remained in revolt. In 1429, he was appointed by the king to succeed Thiri Zeya Thura the Elder as governor of Pakhan and the surrounding ten districts, and to take over the command of a flotilla of ten war boats. (He would retain the governorship at Pyinzi until 1434.) In 1431, he was tapped by the king to lead one of the two armies that would counter the forces of Hanthawaddy Pegu and Toungoo (Taungoo) laying siege to the southern city of Prome (Pyay); the other army was led by the king himself. However, he did not see any action as Thado decided to accept most of the terms set by King Binnya Ran I of Hanthawaddy. Chronicles have no mention of Thihapate for the rest of Thado's reign except in early 1434 when his second son was given the title of Thinkhaya by the king.

Appointment at Mohnyin
Thihapate's career would rise further after King Thado's death in 1439. The rise was not only due to his deep familial ties with the new king—he and King Minye Kyawswa were brothers-in-law, and his second son Thinkhaya was married to the king's only child Min Mya Hnit — but also because of his success in carrying out the new king's more assertive policy. Unlike Thado, Minye Kyawswa was determined to recapture the former vassal states of Ava, and assigned his older brother-in-law to retake the lost northern states. Later in the year, Thihapate marched with a sizable army (9000 men, 500 cavalry, 30 elephants) in an expedition, and was able to gain the submission of Mohnyin and Kale (Kalay) without a fight. The expedition benefited greatly from Mohnyin's overlord Mong Mao being preoccupied with the Chinese attacks, and unable to respond.

This quick success however would keep Thihapate in the north for the rest of his life. He was appointed sawbwa of Mohnyin by the king to be Ava's bulwark in north. His transfer to the north was joined by that of Thiri Zeya Thura the Younger as sawbwa of Kale. He retained his fiefs in Pakhan and the surrounding districts. His wife may have remained in Pakhan as she is also mentioned as the lord of Pakhan (ပခန်းစား) (as opposed to Duchess of Pakhan (ပခန်း မိဖုရား)) in the chronicles.

Mogaung campaign and refusal to be king
His initial tenure at Mohnyin was largely quiet for about two years. Ava was busy with the southeastern campaign in the 1440–1441 dry season, and Mong Mao, which remained preoccupied with the Chinese threat, did not contest Ava's takeover of Mohnyin and Kale. But when the Chinese resumed their attacks on Mong Mao in 1441, Minye Kyawswa ordered an attack on Mogaung, Mong Mao's rear. Thihapate and Thiri Zeya Thura duly marched to Mogaung, 90 km northeast of Mohnyin. But unlike in 1439, the Ava forces faced stiff resistance as the town was defended by Tho Ngan Bwa himself. The supreme sawbwa (lord) of Mong Mao had fled to Mogaung, and was making his last stand.

It was during the siege that the Ava court came calling for Thihapate. King Minye Kyawswa had suddenly died without leaving a male heir, and although his younger brother Viceroy Thihathu of Prome was next in line of succession, the court had selected Thihapate as the successor. (According to Aung-Thwin, the ministers may have preferred Thihapate because they wished to wield greater power at court, knowing that Thihathu was likely to be a stronger leader than Thihapate.) When a messenger informed him at the front that the court had invited him to be the next king, Thihapate refused, saying that he was neither a son nor a younger brother of the king, and that the court should give the throne to the rightful heir, Thihathu, and went back to overseeing the siege.

The siege ended a few weeks later with the surrender of Tho Ngan Bwa. It was a major achievement for Ava as Tho Ngan Bwa not only was the supreme sawbwa of Mong Mao which consisted of 21 vassal states, but also a most wanted man by the Ming court, which had offered the Luchuan district (present-day Longchuan County, Yunnan, China) as reward. The Ava forces rushed back to Ava (Inwa), arriving on 5 April 1442, on the eve of the coronation ceremony of Thihathu. On 6 April 1442, Thihathu ascended the throne with the regnal title of Narapati. During the ceremony, Thihapate and Thiri Zeya Thura presented Tho Ngan Bwa to the new king and the court. In order to prove his loyalty to the new king, Thihapate also presented his eldest son Min Uti to the king at the ceremony.

Defense of the north

Thihapate dutifully returned to Mohnyin after the coronation. Narapati for his part accepted the pledge of allegiance by his older brother-in-law, and kept him at Mohnyin, the main northern outpost of Ava, as the Chinese attention had turned to Ava. The king however was careful in not giving his brother-in-law too much power. He appointed two Shan princes, Tho Kyein Bwa (Chinese: Si Ji-fa) and Tho Bok Bwa (Chinese: Si Bu-fa), as co-sawbwas of Mogaung. Thihapate successfully formed a close relationship with the two sawbwas of Mogaung in defense of the northern states against Chinese incursions in 1444–1445, and 1449–1450, which began due to Ava's refusal to hand over Tho Ngan Bwa.

Death and aftermath
About a year or so after the end of Chinese incursions, Thihapate suddenly died — in either 1450 (or early 1451). The cause of his death is not mentioned in the chronicles. However, his eldest son Min Uti in league with the co-sawbwas of Mogaung revolted, apparently with Chinese encouragement. Ava responded by sending two large armies (combined strength of 19,000 troops, 800 cavalry, 40 elephants) led by the king and the crown prince themselves. The rebellion was put down in 1451, and Uti was executed. The rest of Thihapate's children all became prominent members of the ruling dynasty. His second son, Thinkhaya, succeeded his title of Thihapate and fief at Pakhan. His third child and eldest daughter Saw Hla Min later became the chief queen consort of King Thihathura of Ava (r. 1468–1480).

Military service
The following is a list of military campaigns he took part as reported in the royal chronicles.

Family
Thihapate and his wife Shin Hla Myat were first cousins (if not double first cousins). The couple had had two sons and six daughters.

Notes

References

Bibliography

 
 
 
 
 
 

Ava dynasty
1450s deaths